Schlachthausgasse  is a station on  of the Vienna U-Bahn. It is located in the Landstraße District. It opened in 1991.

References

External links 
 

Buildings and structures in Landstraße
Railway stations opened in 1991
Vienna U-Bahn stations
1991 establishments in Austria
Railway stations in Austria opened in the 20th century